Gran Turismo may refer to:

Cars
 Grand tourer, a type of car for long distance
 Maserati GranTurismo, a two-door 2+2 coupé produced by Maserati
 Studebaker Gran Turismo Hawk
 BMW Gran Turismo

Video games
 Gran Turismo (series), a video game series
 Gran Turismo (1997 video game), the first game in the main series
 Gran Turismo (2009 video game), PlayStation Portable spin-off in the series

Film
 Gran Turismo (film), directed by Neill Blomkamp based on a GT Academy driver that trained on the video game series

Music
 Gran Turismo (album), by The Cardigans
 "Moon over the Castle", a song by Masahiro Andoh

See also
 Grand Tour, an educational trip around the cultural highlights of Europe
 Grand Tour (disambiguation)
 GT (disambiguation)
 Gran Torino, a 2008 film directed by and starring Clint Eastwood
 Gran Torino, a version of the Ford Torino
 GT racing, circuit competition for Gran Turismo sports cars